Jennifer M. Callahan is an American government official who currently serves as town manager of Oxford, Massachusetts.

Early life
Callahan was born on August 24, 1964, in Sutton, Massachusetts. She attended public school is Sutton and Notre Dame Academy, a private, all-girls Roman Catholic high school in Worcester, Massachusetts. Callahan earned a B.S. and B.A. at Boston University and a Masters of Public Health and a Doctorate in High Education Policy Research and Administration from the University of Massachusetts Amherst. Prior to becoming a state legislator, Callahan worked as a registered nurse.

Government career
Callahan served on Sutton's long range planning committee, school committee, and board of selectmen. From 2003 to 2011 she represented the 18th Worcester district in the Massachusetts House of Representatives. While serving in the House, Callahan was also an assistant professor in the graduate school of nursing at the University of Massachusetts Medical School. In June 2016, Callahan was appointed by the Millville board of selectmen to serve as the community's first town administrator. In 2018, Callahan was appointed by the Oxford board of selectmen to serve as that community's town manager. In 2022 she was chosen to serve as town administrator in Borne, Massachusetts, but unexpectedly withdrew from the job a month after being selected.

References

1964 births
American city managers
American nurses
American women nurses
Boston University alumni
Democratic Party members of the Massachusetts House of Representatives
People from Sutton, Massachusetts
University of Massachusetts Amherst College of Education alumni
University of Massachusetts Medical School faculty
Living people
University of Massachusetts Amherst School of Public Health and Health Sciences alumni
American women academics
21st-century American women politicians
Massachusetts city managers